Tarok is a regionally important Plateau language in the Langtang area of southeast Plateau State, Nigeria, where it serves as a local lingua franca. Blench (2004) estimates around 150,000 speakers.

Names for other languages
As the local lingua franca, the Tarok feature prominently in the local ethnic composition of southeast Plateau State. Many Tarok clans can also trace their ancestries back to Chadic-speaking peoples, pointing to a long history of Chadic peoples assimilating into Tarok society. Some Tarok names for neighbouring languages according to Longtau (2004):

Writing system

References

Tarokoid languages
Languages of Nigeria